Mudboy is the debut  studio album by American rapper Sheck Wes. It was released on October 5, 2018, by Interscope Records, GOOD Music, and Cactus Jack Records. The album debuted at number 17 on the Billboard 200 in the United States. It was supported by three singles: "Live Sheck Wes", "Mo Bamba", and "Chippi Chippi". "Mo Bamba" peaked at number 6 on the Billboard Hot 100 in the United States and was a sleeper hit, with the song going viral in mid-2018, approximately a year after its release.

Accolades

Track listing
Credits adapted from Tidal.

Notes
 "Live Sheck Wes" was originally released as "Live SheckWes Die SheckWes".

Personnel
Anthony Kilhoffer – mixing & mastering (tracks 1–8, 10–14)
Marvy Ayy – mixing (track 9)
Take a Daytrip – recording & mastering (track 9)

Charts

Weekly charts

Year-end charts

Certifications

References

2018 debut albums
Sheck Wes albums
Interscope Records albums
Cactus Jack Records albums
GOOD Music albums
Albums produced by Cardo
Albums produced by Take a Daytrip

Punk rap albums